Whitehaven Beach is on Whitsunday Island, Australia. The island is accessible by boat, seaplane & helicopter from Airlie Beach, as well as Hamilton Island. It lies across from Stockyard Beach, better known as Chalkie's Beach, on Haslewood Island. The beach is known for its crystal white silica sands and turquoise coloured waters. The beach has tour barbeque and camping facilities.

History
The beach was named and discovered in 1879 by Staff Commander EP Bedwell. 'Whitehaven'  specifically originates from the English town of the same name, it was one of the many names, from the then English county of Cumberland, which Bedwell brought to the area. It followed James Cook's 1770 naming of the island group, the Cumberland Islands.

Geography
 
The beach was awarded Queensland's Cleanest Beach in Keep Australia Beautiful's 2008 Beach Challenge State Awards. In July 2010, Whitehaven Beach was named the top Eco Friendly Beach in the world by CNN.com. Dogs are not permitted on the beach and cigarette smoking is prohibited.

Whitehaven Beach is known for its bright white sands, which consist of 98% pure silica. Local rocks do not contain silica so it has been suggested that the sands were brought to the beach by prevailing sea currents over millions of years.

Unlike regular sand, the sand on Whitehaven Beach does not retain heat making it comfortable to walk barefoot on a hot day. This sand is also very fine, and can damage electronic equipment such as telephones and cameras, although it is good at polishing up jewellery.

Tourism
Tourists and locals visit Whitehaven Beach to swim and take in the bright white sand. Some visitors eat a BBQ lunch, and campers can stay by booking the National Parks camp facilities.

The Whitehaven Beach Ocean Swim is a 2 km open swimming competition held on the beach in November each year since 2009 as part of the Hamilton Island Triathlon. The 2012 event was held on 11 November 2012. The beach was also featured in the racing video game Forza Horizon 3.

In 2018, the government announced an investment of $3.9 million for the construction of a new long-distance walking track and upgrading of the camping areas on the Island to improve the holiday experience of the visitors. The track will connect Whitehaven Beach to the Tongue Point.

See also

 List of beaches in Australia
 Whitsunday Islands
 Lucky Bay, a beach in Western Australia with white-coloured sand
 Hyams Beach, a beach in New South Wales with white sand

References

External links

Whitsunday Islands
Beaches of Queensland